My Son the Minister (German: Mein Sohn, der Herr Minister) is a 1937 German comedy drama film directed by Veit Harlan and starring Hans Brausewetter, Heli Finkenzeller and Françoise Rosay.

The film's sets were designed by the art directors Franz Koehn and Walter Röhrig. It was shot at the Babelsberg Studios in Potsdam.

Cast 
 Hans Brausewetter as Robert Fabre-Marines 
 Heli Finkenzeller as Nannette - seine Frau 
 Françoise Rosay as Sylvie - seine Mutter 
 Hans Moser as Gabriel Fabre 
 Paul Dahlke as Vaccarés 
 Hadrian Maria Netto as Ministerpresident 
 Carl Jönsson as Aristide - Diener im Ministerium 
 Hilde Körber as Betty Joinville 
 Aribert Wäscher as Baroche 
 Bruno Ziener as Pierre, Diener 
 Carl Auen as Ein Zeitungsreporter 
 Josef Dahmen as Ein revolutionärer Zwischenrufer 
 Angelo Ferrari as Ein Hauptmann 
 Charles Francois as Ein Kellner bei der Soirée 
 Illo Gutschwager as Anwesender bei der politischen Versammlung der 'Roten' 
 Hermann Meyer-Falkow as Plizist vor dem Ministerium 
 Leo Peukert as Kabarett-Direktor 
 Walter Schramm-Duncker as Portier im Ministerium 
 Achim von Biel as Gast der Soirée im Kulturministerium 
 Erika Raphael
 Rudolf Klicks
 Wolfgang Dohnberg
 Fred Köster
 Annie Lorenz
 Martha von Konssatzki

References

Bibliography 
 Bock, Hans-Michael & Bergfelder, Tim. The Concise CineGraph. Encyclopedia of German Cinema. Berghahn Books, 2009.
 Noack, Frank. Veit Harlan: The Life and Work of a Nazi Filmmaker. University Press of Kentucky, 2016.

External links 
 

1937 films
1937 comedy-drama films
German comedy-drama films
Films of Nazi Germany
1930s German-language films
Films directed by Veit Harlan
German black-and-white films
UFA GmbH films
Films shot at Babelsberg Studios
German films based on plays
Films set in Paris
1930s German films